David Lindsay Maxwell (born 8 April 1951, Nairn, Scotland) is a British rower who competed in the 1972 Summer Olympics and in the 1976 Summer Olympics.

Rowing career
In 1968 he rowed in the Eton College eight that won the silver medal in the FISA World Youth Championships in Amsterdam. In 1969 he rowed in the Eton College coxless four that won the Visitors' Challenge Cup at  Henley Royal Regatta and then won the silver medal in the FISA World Youth Championships in Naples

He rowed in the winning Cambridge Boat Race crews in both 1971 and 1972. Also during 1972 he won the coxed pairs title with Michael Hart and Alan Inns, at the 1972 National Rowing Championships. 

In 1972 at the Summer Olympics in Munich, he partnered Mike Hart to finish eighth in the coxed pair event. In 1974 he was a member of the British eight which won the silver medal at the Lucerne World Championships and two years later in 1976, at the Summer Olympics in Montreal he won the silver medal in the eight event.

See also
 List of Cambridge University Boat Race crews

References

External links
 

1951 births
Living people
British male rowers
Cambridge University Boat Club rowers
Olympic rowers of Great Britain
Rowers at the 1972 Summer Olympics
Rowers at the 1976 Summer Olympics
Olympic silver medallists for Great Britain
Olympic medalists in rowing
Medalists at the 1976 Summer Olympics
World Rowing Championships medalists for Great Britain